A coal-black Morgan-American Quarter Horse cross, Black Jack served in the Caisson Platoon of the 3rd U.S. Infantry Regiment (The Old Guard). Named in honor of General of the Armies John J. "Black Jack" Pershing, he was the riderless horse in more than 1,000 Armed Forces Full Honors Funerals (AFFHF), the majority of which were in Arlington National Cemetery. With boots reversed in the stirrups, he was a symbol of a fallen leader.

Early life 
Black Jack was foaled January 19, 1947, and came to Fort Myer from the cavalry remount station at Fort Reno, Oklahoma, on November 22, 1952. Black Jack was the last of the Quartermaster–issue horses branded with the Army's U.S. brand (on the left shoulder) and his Army serial number 2V56 (on the left side of his neck).

Career 
Black Jack served a long and respectable military career. 

Among the highlights were that he participated in four state funerals:

 Presidents:
 John F. Kennedy (1963)
 Herbert Hoover (1964)
 Lyndon B. Johnson (1973)
 Five-star general:
 Douglas MacArthur (1964)

Army Major General Philip C. Wehle was the Commanding General of the Military District of Washington during those state funerals, except for LBJ. At that time Army Major General James Bradshaw Adamson served as commanding general. It was just after that funeral Black Jack was retired.

Death and burial 
Black Jack died after a 29-year military career on February 6, 1976. He was cremated, with his remains laid to rest in a plot at Fort Myer, Virginia, on Summerall Field; his final resting place lies 200 feet (60 m) northeast of the flagpole in the southeast corner of the parade field. He is one of four horses in United States history to be buried with Full Military Honors, the others being Chief, Sergeant Reckless, and Comanche.

See also
 Old Bob, Abraham Lincoln's horse who participated in Lincoln's funeral
 List of historical horses

Notes

External links 
 Black Jack's burial site is at coordinates 

1947 animal births
1976 animal deaths
Ceremonial horses
Individual male horses
Individual Morgan horses
20th-century history of the United States Army